Cora undulata is a species of basidiolichen in the family Hygrophoraceae. Found in Colombia, it was formally described as a new species in 2014 by Leidy Yasmín Vargas, Bibiana Moncada, and Robert Lücking. The lichen is only known to occur at the type locality, where it grows on rocks, often associated with bryophytes in semi-exposed microhabitats. The specific epithet undulata refers to the undulate (wavy) surface of the lobes.

References

undulata
Lichen species
Lichens described in 2014
Lichens of Colombia
Basidiolichens
Taxa named by Robert Lücking